was a Japanese daimyō of the late Edo period. He was the last daimyō of the Nagaoka Domain and, after the Japanese feudal system was abolished in 1871, he served as a regional governor.

References

Daimyo
Meiji Restoration
1859 births
1918 deaths
Makino clan
People from Nagaoka Domain